Life's a Dance is the debut studio album by American country music singer John Michael Montgomery, released on October 13, 1992, by Atlantic Records. It features the singles "Life's a Dance", "Beer and Bones" and "I Love the Way You Love Me", which peaked at #4, #21, and #1, respectively, on the Billboard country charts between 1992 and 1993. The album has been certified 3× Platinum by the RIAA for shipments of three million copies in the United States.

"Takin' Off the Edge" was later recorded by Kevin Denney on his 2002 self-titled debut album. "Dream On Texas Ladies" was originally recorded by Rex Allen Jr. on his 1984 album On the Move and had a Top 20 hit with this song.

Track listing

Personnel

 Bobby All – acoustic guitar
 Kenny Bell – acoustic guitar
 Michael Black – background vocals
 Glen Duncan – fiddle
 Wyatt Easterling – acoustic guitar
 Sonny Garrish – steel guitar
 Rob Hajacos – fiddle
 Owen Hale – drums
 Bill Hullett – electric guitar
 Clayton Ivey – keyboards
 Kirk "Jelly Roll" Johnson – harmonica
 Michael Jones – background vocals
 Jerry Kroon – drums
 Gary Lunn – bass guitar
 John Michael Montgomery – lead vocals, background vocals 
 Steve Nathan – keyboards
 Ron "Snake" Reynolds – electric guitar, percussion
 Brent Rowan – electric guitar
 Tommy Spurlock – steel guitar
 Willie Weeks – bass guitar
 Dennis Wilson – background vocals
 Lonnie Wilson – drums
 Curtis Young – background vocals

Charts

Weekly charts

Year-end charts

References

1992 debut albums
Atlantic Records albums
John Michael Montgomery albums
Albums produced by Doug Johnson (record producer)